Urophora nigricornis is a species of tephritid or fruit flies in the genus Urophora of the family Tephritidae.

Distribution
Turkmenistan.

References

Urophora
Insects described in 1910
Diptera of Asia